Val Rendena [German:Randental] is the valley of the Sarca river in Trentino, northern Italy. The valley is part of the Giudicarie.
Main towns include Spiazzo Rendena and Pinzolo.

Valleys of Trentino